Miguel Ángel de Quevedo is a station along Line 3 of the Mexico City Metro. It is located in Mexico City's southern Coyoacán borough, at the junction of Avenida Miguel Ángel de Quevedo and Avenida Universidad.

General information
The station logo represents a tree. Its name comes from the nearby avenue, which was named in honor of Miguel Ángel de Quevedo, an engineer who founded the nearby Viveros de Coyoacán arboretum and nursery (parts of which are a publicly accessible park and a popular area for recreation). Apparently, this station was initially designed to have a third platform between the other two, but it was never made operational, the design was changed, and today it is used by workers and for access to an electrical substation. The station serves the Colonia Chimalistac, Santa Catarina, and Romero de Terreros districts.  It was opened on 30 August 1983.

This station transfers to trolleybus Line "K1", which runs between Ciudad Universitaria, the main campus of the Universidad Nacional Autónoma de México, and the San Lorenzo Tezonco campus of Universidad Autónoma de la Ciudad de México.

It also serves as a terminal for bus lines 41 and 66 which connect the station to several locations in the Contreras area.

Ridership

Exits
Northeast: Avenida Universidad and Miguel Ángel de Quevedo, Romero de Terreros
Southwest: Avenida Universidad, Chimalistac
West: Avenida Universidad, Chimalistac

References

External links 

Miguel Angel de Quevedo
Railway stations opened in 1983
Mexico City Metro stations in Coyoacán
1983 establishments in Mexico
Accessible Mexico City Metro stations